Lee Yong-jin (born on November 28, 1985) is a South Korean comedian and singer. He is most known for his work on the tvN sketch comedy show Comedy Big League. Lee owns a famous sashimi restaurant, under the name "960", in Sokcho, Gangwon-do province, which opened August 2014.

Philanthropy 
On February 9, 2023, Lee donated 30 million won to help 2023 Turkey–Syria earthquake, by donating money through Korean Red Cross.

Filmography

Music videos

Dramas

Television shows

Web shows

Hosting

Awards and nominations

References

External links
 

1985 births
Living people
South Korean male comedians
South Korean television personalities
People from Hwaseong, Gyeonggi
Best Variety Performer Male Paeksang Arts Award (television) winners